Varun Kumar (born 25 July 1995) is an Indian professional field hockey player who plays as a defender for Punjab Warriors in the Hockey India League and the Indian national team.

Career
Born in Punjab, Kumar belongs to Dalhousie,  District Chamba, Himachal Pradesh. Kumar first started to play hockey when he was in school. He represented his home state of Punjab in the Junior National Championships in 2012 and did very well, earning a call-up to the junior national team. Injury soon after the tournament kept Kumar quiet for two years before he did very well in the 2014 Junior National Championships and was recalled into the junior national team.

Kumar soon managed to sign with the Punjab Warriors in the Hockey India League. He was retained for the 2014 season. After the season, he was retained for a period of two years for the 2015 and 2016 seasons of the league.

International
Kumar has represented the India junior side. He emerged as the top-scorer for India during the Four-Nations Invitational Tournament in Spain before being selected into the side for the Junior World Cup side.

References

https://m.economictimes.com/news/india/himachal-pradesh-govt-announces-rs-1-crore-award-for-hockey-player-varun-kumar-after-olympics-bronze/articleshow/85103527.cms

External links
Varun Kumar at Hockey India

1995 births
Living people
Field hockey players from Punjab, India
Indian male field hockey players
Male field hockey defenders
Olympic field hockey players of India
Field hockey players at the 2020 Summer Olympics
Field hockey players at the 2018 Commonwealth Games
Field hockey players at the 2018 Asian Games
2018 Men's Hockey World Cup players
Asian Games bronze medalists for India
Asian Games medalists in field hockey
Medalists at the 2018 Asian Games
Hockey India League players
Olympic bronze medalists for India
Medalists at the 2020 Summer Olympics
Olympic medalists in field hockey
Field hockey players at the 2022 Commonwealth Games
Commonwealth Games silver medallists for India
Commonwealth Games medallists in field hockey
Recipients of the Arjuna Award
2023 Men's FIH Hockey World Cup players
Medallists at the 2022 Commonwealth Games